Buštranje may refer to:

Buštranje (Bujanovac), Serbia
Buštranje (Preševo), Serbia
Buštranje (Vranje), Serbia